The second OFC Women's Olympic Qualifying Tournament in 2008 determined the Oceania Football Confederation's berth for the  2008 Beijing Olympic football tournament.

First stage
Nine women's teams participated in the first stage, held as the 2007 South Pacific Games in Apia, Samoa. from August 25 to September 7.  The winning team, Papua New Guinea, progressed to the second round to play New Zealand.

Participating Teams

Second stage
The second stage was a play-off between New Zealand and the stage 1 winner. It was apparently planned as a two match play-off, but was eventually played over just one game.

New Zealand won the match 2–0 and progressed to the Beijing Olympics.

References

Football qualification for the 2008 Summer Olympics
2008
Women's football at the 2008 Summer Olympics
Oly